Arjun Sapkota (born 26 January 1999) is a Nepalese singer and songwriter, known for his music in Nepalese folk music industry . As of Oct 2020 Sapkota has given voice to more than 18 Songs "Banki chari" , "Dui duna chaar" , "pachheuri lisyo" , "fulyo gurasha" ,  "Nagara pir maya", "A thuli " including others are his few songs. Sapkota came to limelight after his 2019 Lok Dohori song ' "Banki chari banaima ramayo" with Devi Gharti Magar released on his own YouTube Channel got 10million views on YouTube.

Early life 
Sapkota was born on 26 January 1999 to father Mani Sapkota and mother Durga Sapkota in Pelakot-Syangja district of Nepal. At the age of 5 Sapkota moved to Nawalparasi with his family where he started working at Radio Darpan as a radio jockey before jumping into musical field .

Awards

References 

Living people
Nepalese folk singers
21st-century Nepalese male singers

People from Nawalparasi District
1999 births
Dohori singers